Argyresthia affinis is a moth of the family Yponomeutidae. It is found in North America, including Kentucky and Ohio.

The larvae feed on Juniperus virginiana. They mine the leaves of their host plant.

References

Moths described in 1940
Argyresthia
Moths of North America